Cathegesis psoricopterella is a moth in the family Gelechiidae. It was described by Walsingham in 1892. It is found on the West Indies.

The wingspan is about 10 mm. The forewings are mottled with pale cinereous and fuscous in about equal proportions. The latter predominating along the dorsal half to the anal angle and in two costal patches, the first scarcely before, the other beyond the middle. There is also a fuscous streak from the costa near the base, and a fuscous spot at the extreme apex followed by a fuscous line around the apical margin but not reaching to the anal angle. The hindwings are dark greyish.

References

Moths described in 1892
Dichomeridinae
Moths of the Caribbean